Friends School Mullica Hill is a private, coeducational day school located in the Mullica Hill section of Harrison Township, New Jersey, United States, serving 150 students in pre-kindergarten through eighth grade.

Friends School Mullica Hill is accredited by the Middle States Association of Colleges and Schools, Commission on Elementary Schools, and is a member of the National Association of Independent Schools, the Association of Delaware Valley Independent Schools and the New Jersey Association of Independent Schools. 

The school was founded in 1969 as a pre-k through 12th grade college preparatory Friends School, having moved from Woodbury, New Jersey where it was a kindergarten through 8th grade school. In 1992, the high school was laid down. The school currently has students in grades pre-kindergarten (3 years old) through 8th grade.

There are two main buildings on campus: the Noel Baker Building and the Hanshi Deshbandhu. The main campus is 22 acres with an additional 14 acres in the nearby Heritage Woods Tract which contains a nature trail and low ropes adventure course.

The current Head of school is Matthew Bradley.

References

External links
School website
Data for Friends School Mullica Hill, National Center for Education Statistics

Harrison Township, New Jersey
Schools in Gloucester County, New Jersey
New Jersey Association of Independent Schools
Private elementary schools in New Jersey
Private middle schools in New Jersey
Quaker schools in New Jersey